Irish verb forms are constructed either synthetically or analytically.

Synthetic forms express the information about person and number in the ending: e.g.,  "I praise", where the ending - stands for "1st person singular present". In this case, a pronoun is not allowed: * is ungrammatical.  is allowed but using the - ending is more common.

Analytic forms are those whose endings contain no information about person and number, and a pronoun is necessary: e.g.,  "you (pl.) praise", where the ending - expresses only the present tense, and the pronoun  "you" (pl.) must accompany it in order to express "2nd person plural".

In addition to the three persons, Irish also has an impersonal form (also called the "autonomous" form), which is used in forming the passive and can conveniently be translated with "one" or "someone" as the subject. Shown below are the distribution of synthetic and analytic forms in the standard language; in the dialects, other patterns may be found, although some of the most important distinctions made in certain dialects are pointed out in this article.

See Irish orthography for the pronunciation of verb endings.

Regular verbs
There are two conjugation classes of regular verbs, as illustrated below. Forms in italics are not part of the standard language.
The suffixes shown change to agree with the word ending in a velarised ("broad") consonant or palatalised ("slender") consonant. In the examples below, verbs ending with "broad" consonants are shown above those ending with "slender" consonants.

A stem beginning with  + a vowel takes both, e.g. "wait",  "he waited". The preterite impersonal, e.g. "one waited", neither undergoes lenition nor receives . The -- in future and conditional stems is pronounced ; except in the conditional 2nd person singular and the impersonal, where it remains .

1st conjugation

2nd conjugation
Second stem verbs take the same base suffixes as first conjugation verbs, but add the infix in -- (most forms), or -- (in the future and conditional).

Roots ending in a slender consonant undergo syncope before the addition of --.

Irregular verbs
There are eleven irregular verbs in Standard Irish; individual dialects have a few more. Most of them are characterized by suppletion, that is, different roots are used to form different tenses. Analytic forms are indicated by the symbol +. The preterites of many irregular verbs take the nonpreterite forms of preverbal particles, i.e. Some verbs have different independent and dependent forms in certain tenses; the independent forms are used when no particle precedes the verb, and also after  "if" (open conditional) and the direct relative particle , while the dependent forms are used after all other particles.

"to say"
The - in this verb's independent forms is not lenited, and the dependent forms are slightly archaic.

"to bear"

"to be"
If a noun phrase is in the predicate, then forms of the particle "is" are used rather than anything below.

/ "to hear" 

 is used in southern and south-central Irish (Munster, Connemara, Aran Islands etc.), whereas  is used in northern and north-central varieties (Mayo, Ulster).

"to do, to make"

"to find, to get"
The - in forms of this verb is eclipsed rather than lenited after .

"to see"

"to eat"

"to give, to bring, (to be named)"

The meaning "to be named" is often found in writings and can therefore be considered as strange for learners. When meaning "to be named" the verbform is usually followed by the preposition "ar", which is also inflected due to the person it is connected with. e.g.:
  "Seán, as he was (usually) called, was very happy." 
  "Seán is giving me the apple."

"to come"

"to go"

Preverbal particles
Irish uses a number of preverbal particles to modify the meaning of a sentence. In a positive statement, no particle is used and the verb comes first (except in Munster Irish where   is placed before verbs in the past, habitual past and conditional, leniting the verb that follows). This is still seen in the Standard Language in said tenses, prefixed to verbs beginning with vowels, e.g.  "I drank":
 "Seán understands Irish."
 "Seán understood Irish."
 "Seán would understand Irish."

Negative particles
To negate a statement, the particle  is used, which causes lenition; a  before a vowel or lenited  is omitted:
 "Seán doesn't understand Irish."
 "Seán wouldn't understand Irish."
 "Séamas would not drink the milk." (cf.  "Séamas would drink the milk.")
 "Úna would not wait for me." (cf.  "Úna would wait for me.")
In the preterite, the particle  is used . There is lenition but no .
 "Seán didn't understand Irish."
 "Séamas didn't drink the milk." (cf.  "Séamas drank the milk.")
 "Úna didn't wait for me." (cf.  "Úna waited for me.")
(In Ulster, the negative particles , pret.  are also used)

Interrogative particles
To pose a simple yes/no question, the particle  is used, which causes eclipsis (no eclipsis of vowels, because  already ends with ). In the preterite  (+ lenition) is used. The prefix  is omitted:
 "Does Seán understand Irish?"
 "Would Seán understand Irish?"
 "Does Séamas drink milk?"
 "Would Úna wait for me?"
 "Did Seán understand Irish?"
 "Did Séamas drink the milk?"
 "Did Úna wait for me?"

These particles are also used to introduce an indirect question:
 "I don't know if Seán understands Irish."
 "I wonder if Séamas drank the milk."

Negative interrogative particles
To pose a negative yes/no question, the particle  is used, which causes eclipsis (in preterite:  + lenition):
 "Doesn't Seán understand Irish?"
 "Wouldn't Seán understand Irish?"
 "Wouldn't Séamas drink the milk?"
 "Wouldn't Úna wait for me?"
 "Didn't Seán understand Irish?"
 "Didn't Séamas drink the milk?"
 "Didn't Úna wait for me?"

Wh-interrogative particles
To pose a wh-question, one of the interrogative particles , /,  etc. is used.
 "Where will you put the letter?"
 "What will the neighbors think?"
 "When will you sell your house?"
 "Who will stand next to me?"
 "How will you clean the dress?"

Verbal nouns

Formation
Irish has no infinitive and uses instead the verbal noun. The verbal noun can be formed using different strategies (mostly suffixes). The most common of these are:
Suffix -adh, e.g.,  "soften" : 
Suffix -áil, e.g.,  "leave" : 
Suffix -ú, e.g.,  "lift" : 
Suffix -amh, e.g.,  "spend" : 
Suffix -t, e.g.,  "defend" : 
Suffix -úint, e.g.,  "follow" : 
Slender consonant is made broad, e.g.,  "prevent" : 
Suffix -ach, e.g.,  "buy" : 
No change, e.g.,  "drink" : 
Suffix -cht, e.g.,  "awake" : 
Suffix -e, e.g.,  "dance" :

Usage
The verbal noun is used as the infinitive would be used in English.
 . "He asked me to go."
 . "I would rather stay."
A progressive can be expressed with the preposition  and is equivalent to the English present participle.
 "Seán is working."
. "Máire was speaking."
 "She has (just) mowed the grass." (cf. Hiberno-English "She is after cutting the grass.")
 "He had (just) washed the cups." (cf. Hiberno-English "He was after washing the cups.")

The subjunctive
The subjunctive covers the idea of wishing something and so appears in some famous Irish proverbs and blessings. It is considered an old-fashioned tense for daily speech (except in set phrases) but still appears often in print. E.g.,

  "May you be well." (lit: May you go well.)
  "May God give you sense."
  "May the Devil make thunder of your soul in Hell."

It is important to note that when the subjunctive is used in English, it may not be used in Irish, and another tense might be used instead:

  "If I were (past subjunctive) you, I would study for the exam tomorrow."
  "It is important that he choose (present sub.) the right way."
  "When you're (present ind.) older, you'll understand."
  "I wish (that) you were (past sub.) here."

While the relative pronoun that can be omitted in English, the corresponding  is mandatory in Irish.

See also
Irish grammar

Verbs
Indo-European verbs